The Broe helmet (also known as the Broa helmet) is a decorated iron helmet from around the Vendel Period. Discovered around 1904 in a cremation grave in Broe, a farm on the Swedish island Gotland, it was located alongside other items including fragments of shields, weapons, bridles, and game pieces. Due to its extremely fragmented condition, only an incomplete reconstruction of the helmet is possible, but it appears to have been an example of the "crested helmets" that flourished in England and Scandinavia from the sixth through eleventh centuries.

A full speculative reconstruction was attempted in 1969, suggesting a cap made in segments, with brow and nose-to-nape bands; pieces of metal attached to the brow band likely provided neck, cheek, and face protection. The nose-to-nape band was decorated with ornamental bronze sheeting, and an eyebrow piece, which survives in full and also featured animal-head terminals, was inlaid with strips of a material such as silver. This appearance is generally consistent with the contemporaneous Vendel XIV helmet, which the Broe example may have looked somewhat similar to.

The helmet is hard to date by itself, but the style and type of the grave goods suggests a date in the second half of the 7th century AD. This is consistent with the Vendel XIV grave, which is variously dated between 520 and 625 AD, and shares similarities with the Broe grave even beyond the helmets; in particular, decorated iron fragments from the graves share an identical design.

Description 

The Broe helmet survives in a fragmentary state, with a speculative artistic reconstruction. When whole, it included an iron cap, likely constructed in sections, with both a brow band and a nose-to-nape band. The latter band, to which may belong a fragment with traces of ornamental bronze sheeting, terminated above the eyebrows with an animal head, its eyes formed with inlaid garnets. A fragment of the nose-to-nape band retains an animal-head impression that does not match the surviving head, suggesting that a second animal head terminal adorned the rear of the helmet. Strips of iron hanging from the brow band provided neck and cheek protection. The one surviving cheek piece is fragmentary, but appears to have extended deeply. Further strips extended from the nose-to-nape band to cover the nose, and encircled the eyes to protect the face. Over the eyes ran an ornamental eyebrow piece, made of iron inlaid with thin strips of another material—possibly silver—and terminating in an animal head on either side.

The helmet may once have appeared similar, in some respects, to the Vendel XIV helmet. Both had deep hinged plates protecting the cheeks and neck, a flat crest terminating in animal heads, and ornamented eyebrows. The Broe example is too fragmentary, however, for its exact design to be determined.

Discovery 

The helmet was discovered around 1904 in a grave in Broe, a farm in the community of Högbro, located within Halla socken in the central region of the Swedish island Gotland. The grave was uncovered while digging a garden; the excavation measured approximately a foot in depth, and half a kappland (about 154 square metres) in area. All but one object, a round bronze clasp with three animal heads, was damaged by fire.

In addition to the clasp with three animal heads, bronze objects from the grave included an inlaid round clasp, two ring-shaped items with animal-head decoration, parts of handle to a ring-sword, seven large hemispherical rivet heads, four smaller rivets, and around 35 types of fragmentary strap fittings, several with animal ornamentation; two of these were iron with bronze ornamentation, and five were hat shaped. Several of the fittings, and perhaps the ring-shaped items, belonged to shield handles. Iron objects included three two-edged swords, two wide and four slim one-edged swords, eight spearheads, four shield bosses, several shield handles, four bridles, a knife, a pair of scissors, and several fittings—including some for the edges of shields—in addition to the helmet. Non-metal objects from the grave included pieces of a green glass cup, mostly melted away, seven fragments of bone game pieces, and some burnt pieces of bone, possibly from a horse.

The items were acquired by the Statens historiska museum in 1904, where they were collectively given the inventory number 12,291. In 1907 the finds were published along with sketched illustrations of some of the items in Månadsblad, a  monthly publication of the Royal Swedish Academy of Letters, History and Antiquities. Illustrations of a number of the finds, including a speculative reconstruction of the helmet, were published in volume II of Birger Nerman's book on the Vendel Period finds from Gotland, Die Vendelzeit Gotlands—followed six years later by volume I, the textual companion.

Typology 

Difficult to date by itself, the Broe helmet and finds from the same site appear characteristic of early Migration Period style. Certain features of the Broe helmet, particularly its eyebrow piece, are similar to helmets and fragments found in Gotland, such as the Lokrume helmet fragment, and on the mainland, in Uppland. In particular, the Broe helmet's similarities to the Vendel XIV helmet, which has been variously dated from 520 to 625 AD, may suggest a comparable date; ornamented iron fragments in each burial, unrelated to the helmets, even bear the same stamped design. Other objects from the Broe grave, likewise, suggest a date in the second half of the 6th century AD.

The Broe helmet fits into the corpus of "crested helmets" known in Northern Europe from the 6th through the 11th centuries AD. Such helmets were characterized by a rounded cap and usually a prominent nose-to-nape crest. Other than a Viking Age fragment found in Kyiv, they uniformly originate from England or Scandinavia. More than half of the known examples are from Sweden; up to twenty are from Gotland alone, although these were typically found in cremation burials and comprise only a fragment or two.

Gallery

Notes

References

Bibliography 

 
 
 
 
 
 
  
 
 
 
  
  
  
 
 French edition of 
  

6th-century artifacts
7th-century artifacts
1904 archaeological discoveries
Archaeological discoveries in Sweden
Germanic archaeological artifacts
Individual helmets
Medieval helmets